Brillhart is a surname. Notable people with the surname include:

 Jeffrey Brillhart (born 1955), American organist, improviser, and conductor
 Jessica Brillhart, American immersive director, writer and theorist
 John Brillhart (1930–2022), American mathematician